Dyki tantsi (Ukrainian: Дикі танці; transl. Wild Dances) is the fourth studio album by Ukrainian singer-songwriter Ruslana. It was released on June 10, 2003. Some of the songs featured in this album are also featured on Wild Dances, after she won the 2004 Eurovision Song Contest.

Track listing

Russian edition

Czech edition

Eurobonus edition

Release history

Charts

External links
Album review

References 

2003 albums
Ruslana albums